Al Carlson (born November 21, 1948) is a Republican politician in North Dakota. He was a member of the North Dakota House of Representatives from the 41st District, serving since 1992. Representative Carlson is the chamber's majority leader, a position he has held since 2009.

Carlson lost his reelection bid in the 2018 general election, so  those positions on January 1, 2019.

References

1948 births
21st-century American politicians
Living people
Republican Party members of the North Dakota House of Representatives
People from Breckenridge, Minnesota